The Claxby Ironstone is a geologic formation in England. It preserves fossils dating back to the Cretaceous period.

See also

 List of fossiliferous stratigraphic units in England

References
 

Cretaceous England
Valanginian Stage
Hauterivian Stage
Lower Cretaceous Series of Europe